Electricity is the set of physical phenomena associated with the presence and motion of electric charge.

Electricity may also refer to:

Film and television
 Electricity (film), a film released in 2014
 "Electricity", an episode of Afterworld
 "Electricity", an episode of The Science Alliance
 "Electricity, Electricity", an episode of Schoolhouse Rock!

Music

Albums
 Electricity (album), by Peter Jefferies
 Electricity, by Paul Janz
 Electricity, by Electones

Songs
 "Electricity" (The Avalanches song)
 "Electricity" (Captain Beefheart song)
 "Electricity" (Elton John song)
 "Electricity" (Orchestral Manoeuvres in the Dark song)
 "Electricity" (Silk City and Dua Lipa song)
 "Electricity" (Suede song)
 "Electricity", by Anathema from A Natural Disaster
 "Electricity", by Blood Axis
 "Electricity", by Elisa from Lotus
 "Electricity", by Headless Chickens from Greedy
 "Electricity", by Longview from Mercury
 "Electricity", by Lync from Remembering the Fireballs (Part 8)
 "Electricity", by Midnight Star from No Parking on the Dance Floor
 "Electricity", by Joni Mitchell from For the Roses
 "Electricity", by Kompressor from World Domination
 "Electricity", by Moby from "Drop a Beat"
 "Electricity", by Monrose from I Am
 "Electricity", by Motörhead from Bad Magic
 "Electricity", by Pet Shop Boys from Bilingual
 "Electricity", by Spiritualized from Ladies and Gentlemen We Are Floating in Space
 "Electricity", by Something for Kate from Beautiful Sharks
 "Electricity", by 311 from Transistor
 "Electricity, Electricity", from TV-series Schoolhouse Rock!, released on Schoolhouse Rock! Soundtrack
 covered by Goodness on Schoolhouse Rock! Rocks

Other uses in music
 Electricity: OMD with the Royal Liverpool Philharmonic Orchestra, a concert film

Books
Electricity, 1995 novel by Victoria Glendinning
Electricity, 2006 novel by Ray Robinson

See also
 
 Electric (disambiguation)
 Electric City (disambiguation)